Pseudonebularia tornata is a species of sea snail, a marine gastropod mollusk, in the family Mitridae, the miters or miter snails.

Distribution
This species occurs in Papua New Guinea.

References

tornata
Gastropods described in 1845